Martina Tufeković (born July 16, 1994 in Heilbronn) is a German-Croatian football goalkeeper for the Germany national team.

Career

Club 
Tufeković began her career in 2004 as a field-playing all-rounder in the male F youth team at VfL Obereisesheim.  During this time she attended the sports school Ruit in Ostfildern in addition to her active football career.  In 2009 she moved from Obereisesheim to the youth team at TSG 1899 Hoffenheim and retrained as a goalkeeper. A year later, at the age of 17, she moved up to the senior team, where she was a substitute goalkeeper in the 2nd Bundesliga. She did not play in her first season and was on the bench as a substitute goalkeeper in four games. On the 18th day of the 2nd Bundesliga season 2011/12, she made her senior debut on April 15, 2012 against 1. FC Köln. She played in four more games through the end of the 2012 season before going back to the second team in September 2012. Due to injuries, Tufeković only played in six games for the reserve in the Regionalliga Süd. After the 2012/13 season, the first team was promoted to the Bundesliga and so they made their debut in the top female division on April 13, 2014 against 1. FFC Turbine Potsdam.

National Team 
Tufeković has been in the extended squad for the Croatia national team since 2012.  There she plays together with the substitute goalkeeper of the second team of TSG 1899 Hoffenheim Nicole Vuk. In 2021 Tufeković was called up for the first time to the German national team. For the 2022 European Championship in England, she was not on the squad but was available on call.

Awards 
In January 2012, she was nominated alongside Duje Dragun Pende (SV Wehen Wiesbaden) and Marko Mićanovic (SC Wiener Neustadt) in the election of the Večernjakova domovnica home prize in the football category of the best junior sportswomen outside of Croatia.  At the final award ceremony on March 17, 2012 in the Landgraf-Friedrich-Saal Kurhaus & Kurtheater in Bad Homburg, she was eighth in the junior athlete category.

Web Links 
Commons: Tina Tufeković- Collection of images, videos, and audio files

 Martina Tufeković in the worldfootball.net database
 Martina Tufeković in the soccerdonna.de database
 Martina Tufekovićin the database of the German Football Association

References 

1994 births
Living people
German people of Croatian descent
Women's association football goalkeepers
German women's footballers
Croatian women's footballers
Sportspeople from Heilbronn
TSG 1899 Hoffenheim (women) players
Frauen-Bundesliga players
Footballers from Baden-Württemberg